Strum Sum Up is the fourth solo studio album by King's X vocalist and bassist Doug Pinnick. The album contains many guest appearances, including Steve Stevens, Alain Johannes, Natasha Shneider, Hal Sparks, Wally Farkas from Galactic Cowboys, Ray Luzier, and Kellii Scott from Failure.

Track listing
Perfect World
Perfect World Pt. 2
Damn It
Dynomite
Dynomite Pt. 2
Life Is What You Make It
Life Is What You Make It Pt. 2
Angel
Coming Over
Smile
All I Want
Hostile World
Cross It
Cross It Pt. 2

References

External links
Strum Sum Up entry on Doug Pinnick's website

2007 albums
Doug Pinnick albums
Magna Carta Records albums